Mary Curran may refer to:

Mary Doyle Curran, American poet and novelist
Mary Florence Curran, American artist and gallerist